Mu Yiming (born 22 April 1999) is a Chinese footballer currently playing as a midfielder for Chengdu Rongcheng.

Club career
Born in Dalian, Liaoning, Mu started his career with the Chengdu FA in 2010. Trials with French team Metz and Spanish side Real Sociedad followed, before Mu eventually joined Belgian side Tubize in 2018.

On his return to China, he joined China League One side Chengdu Rongcheng. However, after three years with no appearances for the senior side, he was loaned to Shijiazhuang Gongfu in May 2022.

International career
Mu has represented China from under-14 to under-19 level.

Career statistics

Club

Notes

References

1999 births
Living people
Footballers from Dalian
Footballers from Liaoning
Chinese footballers
China youth international footballers
Association football midfielders
Challenger Pro League players
A.F.C. Tubize players
Chengdu Rongcheng F.C. players
Chinese expatriate footballers
Chinese expatriate sportspeople in Belgium
Expatriate footballers in Belgium